"The Lovers Are Losing" is a song performed and composed by English rock band Keane, released on 20 October 2008 as the second single from their third album, Perfect Symmetry. It was played for first the time on Hit40uk on 24 August 2008.

Track listing

CD single
"The Lovers Are Losing" — 5:06
"Time to Go" — 3:50

7" single
"The Lovers Are Losing" — 5:04
"Time to Go" — 3:49

Digital download bundle #1
"The Lovers Are Losing" (radio edit) — 3:48

Digital download bundle #2
"The Lovers Are Losing" — 5:04
"Time to Go" — 3:49

Digital download bundle #3
"The Lovers Are Losing" (live from the Forum) — 5:24
"The Lovers Are Losing" (demo) — 5:17
"The Lovers Are Losing" (CSS remix) — 4:35

Release history

Music video
The music video for the song was released on 1 October, and features singer Tom Chaplin running through the wild and being shot at, with scenes of bombardments by jet aircraft.

Chart performance
Despite being released as the first physical release taken from Perfect Symmetry, "The Lovers Are Losing" underperformed in the UK Singles Chart and performed even worse than Keane's previous single "Spiralling" which peaked at #23 despite not being physically released. This single was to peak at a disappointing #52, making it Keane's first single to fail to dent the UK Top 40. It spent three weeks in the UK Top 100.

Charts

References

External links
Official Keane site
Keaneshaped on "The Lovers Are Losing"

2008 singles
Keane (band) songs
Songs written by Tim Rice-Oxley
Songs written by Tom Chaplin
Songs written by Richard Hughes (musician)
2008 songs
Island Records singles